is a Japanese humanitarian, actress, model and beauty pageant titleholder who was crowned Miss Universe Japan 2006 and competed at Miss Universe 2006 where she finished as the first runner-up.

Miss Universe 2006

Chibana is known for her participation in Miss Universe 2006 where she represented Japan.She won the Best National Costume Award for her samurai-themed outfit designed by the artist Yuichi Miyagawa and the designer Yoshiyuki Ogata, and was the first runner-up. During the final, Chibana wore a black evening gown exhibiting intricate latticework designed by Olivier Theyskens for Rochas, and at the preliminaries, Chibana sported a unique red and pink-hued gown with silver corseting designed by Novespazio.

During the pageant, held in Los Angeles, Chibana was the crowd favorite and her flirty winks drew an unusually enthusiastic response from the audience. In spite of the crowd support, her performance in both the swimsuit and evening gown segments were consistently the best and she made it to the top 5 over heavy favorites Miss Mexico and Miss Colombia, despite wearing an ordinary gown.

Chibana was very charismatic especially during the interview portion. Paula Shugart, President of the Miss Universe Organization said in an interview that the scores between Zuleyka and Kurara were very close. During the announcement of the winner, the audience was very vocal in their support for Chibana. Japan had not come that close to winning the crown since 1959 when Akiko Kojima won the first Miss Universe crown for Japan. Chibana's successor, Riyo Mori won the Miss Universe 2007 title in Mexico City. She also managed to outdo the two Japanese women who managed to enter the semifinals in most recent years: Miyako Miyazaki, fourth runner-up in 2003, and Mizuho Sakaguchi, third runner-up in 1988.

Personal information
Chibana was an educational-philosophy student at Sophia University. She got her Bachelor of Arts degree in 2006. She turned down a job offer from a publishing company in order to compete in the Miss Universe Japan pageant, which was held on April 25, 2006, in Tokyo. Kurara now works as a feature reporter, flying around the world to interview people for a leading fashion magazine in Japan. She writes and takes photos of their lifestyles. She speaks four languages: English, Spanish, French, and Japanese.

Since October 2006, she has appeared regularly on the Nippon Television show "News Zero", reporting from both domestic and international locations, and launched her endorsement career as a spokesperson for more than four world-famous brands in 2007. She is the spokeswoman for Maybelline New York's Angelfit Make-Up. In late December, Global Beauties named Kurara as the Sexiest Woman Alive 2006, a title formerly held by her co-patriot/beauty diva, Miyako Miyazaki.

In December 2013, Chibana was elected as the Japanese Ambassador for United Nations World Food Program because of her contributions to the organization as a celebrity partner.

In October 2017, Chibana announced that she had married her boyfriend Ryuji Kamiyama.

References

External links

 Official website
 Miss Universe Japan
 Maybelline New York - Foundation
 Maybelline New York Interview about Make-up

1982 births
Living people
Japanese actresses
Japanese beauty pageant winners
Japanese female models
Japanese reporters and correspondents
Japanese television personalities
Miss Universe 2006 contestants
People from Naha
Ambassadors of supra-national bodies
World Food Programme people
Models from Okinawa Prefecture
Ryukyuan people